Dave Schulz may refer to:

Dave Schulz (musician), American keyboardist
Dave Schulz (politician) (1949–2007), American politician

See also
David Schultz (disambiguation)